Kürmük Qakh FK was an Azerbaijani football club from Qakh that played in the Azerbaijan Top Division and Azerbaijan First Division.

History
The club was founded in 1990, and dissolved at the end of the 1994–95 Azerbaijan First Division season. They competed in the Azerbaijan Top Division three times before their relegation at the end of the 1993–94 season.

League and domestic cup history

References 

Kurmuk Qakh
Association football clubs established in 1990
Defunct football clubs in Azerbaijan
1990 establishments in Azerbaijan